Sheffield United Football Club participated in League One, the third level of English football in 2012–13, after having failed to win promotion, losing in the previous season's play-off final. Danny Wilson remained in charge for a second season and the club continued to reduce costs as they sought to adapt to life at the third level of English football.  Many of the players involved in the previous season were either sold or released, while the likes of Nick Blackman, Tony McMahon, Shaun Miller and Dave Kitson were signed to replace them.

The team went unbeaten in the league until November, briefly climbing to the top of the table, and returned to first place once again over the Christmas period.  United had little success in the various cup competitions however, as they were beaten in the first round of the Football League Cup by Burton Albion, and by Coventry City in the Football League Trophy.  They did manage to reach the fourth round of the FA Cup but were comprehensively beaten by Reading, a result which came amidst a rapid downturn in league form during January, that almost saw United almost drop out of the play-off places. After a brief recovery through February, the decline in results continued and following another string of poor results in April, Danny Wilson was dismissed as manager, with coach Chris Morgan being appointed as caretaker for the remainder of the season.

Despite the change of manager, United's form did not significantly improve and they finished the season in 5th place in the league, thus facing Yeovil Town in the play-offs.  Having beaten Yeovil 1–0 in the first leg, they were defeated by two goals in the second and as such were consigned to remain in League One for at least another season.

Background

The previous season had been United's first in the third tier of English football for 23 years and had seen them install Danny Wilson as manager. United had competed for automatic promotion throughout the season but when top scorer Ched Evans was handed a prison sentence after being convicted of rape in April, the team's results tailed off towards the end of the season and they were overtaken by local rivals Sheffield Wednesday who claimed the final automatic promotion spot. United reached the play-off final but were beaten on penalties by Huddersfield Town, consigning United to a second season in League One.

Team kit
In June United struck a deal with gaming company Redtooth to sponsor the team's away kit for the coming season. It had been expected that the team shirts would be jointly sponsored by Westfield Health and Gilders as per the previous season but the club announced that the car dealers were to continue a commercial relationship with the club but would no longer be shirt sponsors. At the end of July United officially launched their new away kit baring Redtooth's logo. In a change to the previous season the shirt itself was predominantly black with a light-red trim and a light-red diagonal stripe across the chest. In September the club announced a new third kit, this one being all white, introduced to avoid further colour clashes. At the end of that month the club also announced a new secondary kit sponsor, revealing that the GCI Com logo would be included on the back of the team shirts.

Season overview

Pre-season
Pre-season began with 11 players being released, including former Player of the Year James Beattie, defenders Andy Taylor and Johnny Ertl, and first choice stopper Steve Simonsen. Three senior out-of-contract players were offered new terms with Kevin McDonald, Chris Porter and Lee Williamson being offered the chance to remain with United. On 5 July Chris Porter signed a two-year contract with the option of a third, while Academy graduate Jordan Chapell also agreed a new one-year deal. The following day young right-back Matthew Lowton was sold to Premier League Aston Villa for an undisclosed fee. The Blades returned to pre-season training having arranged the now annual pre-season tour of Malta, followed by a string of low key friendlies. With manager Danny Wilson seeking to improve the squad, on 13 July he signed 19-year-old striker John Cofie from Manchester United on a season-long loan. The first game of pre-season came against non-league Ilkeston where a side relying mainly on young players and triallists were held to a 1–1 draw after Harry Maguire had opened the scoring. A day later the Blades made their first permanent signing of the transfer window with 21-year-old right back Darryl Westlake signing a two-year deal with the option of a third year, with a fee to be agreed with his former club Walsall via a tribunal due to his age.

The squad commenced their summer training camp on the island of Malta and their next fixture saw them record a comfortable 6–0 victory over local side Zejtun Corinthians. As the training camp continued Chris Morgan announced during a question and answer session with the fans in attendance that he had decided to retire from playing due to a recurrent injury, and that he would now focus solely on his role as reserve-team coach. The following day United confirmed that Kevin McDonald had signed a new two-year contract, the news coming a couple of hours before the Blades were held to a 0–0 draw by Maltese side Hibernians. Back in the UK, and with July almost over, United made a triple signing, handing two-year deals to defenders Tony McMahon who had been released by Middlesbrough, and former loanee Matt Hill who had left Blackpool, along with signing striker Shaun Miller for an undisclosed fee from Crewe Alexandra. United's final game of July saw them take on Rotherham United at their newly opened ground, The New York Stadium, and recording a 1–0 victory thanks to a goal from loanee John Cofie.

As August began a United XI travelled the short distance to Hallam where two goals each from Ironside and Philliskirk were enough to secure a comfortable 4–0 victory. Joe Ironside was on target again a few days later as both he and new signing Tony McMahon scored to give United a 2–0 victory at Morecambe. With pre-season coming to an end reserve coach Chris Morgan took a young United XI side to Matlock Town where they recorded a 1–0 victory thanks to a goal from Erik Tønne. Then, the day before the season opener against Burton Albion, United announced the signing of Blackburn Rovers striker Nick Blackman on a two-year deal for an undisclosed fee.

August and September: Too many draws

The Blades first competitive game of the season was a home League Cup tie against Burton Albion. Howard, Miller, Blackman, McMahon and McFadzean all made their first team débuts for United but with the game tied at 2–2 after extra time United lost on penalties for the second game in succession. The Blades began their league campaign with a home game against newly promoted Shrewsbury Town, winning 1–0 thanks to a goal from former Shrewsbury loanee David McAllister. A trip to Coventry City followed a few days later with United snatching a late goal for a 1–1 draw, with the same result being repeated the following Saturday as the Blades were held to another draw by Colchester United.

With the transfer window closing at the end of August, United continued to reshape their squad in an effort to reduce the wage bill, agreeing a new contract with Richard Cresswell for him to become player coach. On the final day of transfer activity the club agreed to sell Stephen Quinn to Hull City for an undisclosed fee, and allowed Nick Montgomery, the club's then longest serving player, to leave in order to move to Australia. United concluded their summer transfer dealings by offering former Portsmouth striker Dave Kitson a short-term deal to run up until Christmas 2012.

September began with a 5–3 victory over Bournemouth at Bramall Lane thanks in part to a brace of goals from Ryan Flynn. Flynn was also a central figure in the following game as both he and fellow midfielder Michael Doyle were shown red cards against Scunthorpe United before the Blades came from behind to grab a 1–1 draw. Off the field, the following week the club parted company with Chief Executive Julian Winter and Director of Academy Coaching John Pemberton, citing ongoing restructuring. With the red cards for both Doyle and Flynn being upheld on appeal, Danny Wilson bolstered the squad by bringing forward Paul Gallagher in on a months loan from Leicester City. Back on the pitch Gallagher, Kitson and Westlake all made their United debuts as the Blades were held to a 1–1 draw by Bury at Bramall Lane, whilst a 0–0 draw was the result when Doncaster Rovers visited Sheffield a couple of days later. A third goal of the season from Neill Collins was enough to continue the Blades' unbeaten start with a 1–0 victory over Yeovil Town at Huish Park. Despite the return of Michael Doyle and Ryan Flynn from suspension and a first goal from Dave Kitson, United were forced to settle for yet another 1–1 draw in their last game of September, versus Notts County at Bramall Lane.

October and November: Long live King George

October started more positively for the Blades as a late goal from Paul Gallagher, his first for the club, snatched a victory in an away fixture against Hartlepool United. United then made it two wins in a row on their travels as they defeated Leyton Orient 1–0 thanks to Nick Blackman's fifth goal of the campaign. During the match Mark Howard suffered a thigh injury in the 11th minute, being replaced in goal by George Long, and was later ruled out for up to 12 weeks. The following week, and despite attempts to retain his services, Paul Gallagher's loan period expired and he returned to his parent club. The Blades also announced changes to the Football Club board, with chairman Chris Steer stepping down to be replaced by Dave Green, and Nigerian financier Jacob Esan being added as a director. Despite George Long having made some impressive performances, Danny Wilson still looked to bring in another goalkeeper as cover and confirmed that former Wales international and free agent Danny Coyne had been invited to train with the Blades; but insisted that Long would continue to be first choice for the time being. The Blades then entertained Oldham Athletic at Bramall Lane, a bad tempered match which saw Oldham score in the seventh minute of injury time to snatch a 1–1 draw, and Lactics striker Lee Croft subsequently accused of racially abusing a ball boy. Having received a bye for the first round, United began their Football League Trophy campaign with a 4–1 victory over Notts County at Meadow Lane. Lecsinel Jean-François played for the first time in over six months after a knee injury, appearing for the last 15 minutes as a substitute, however he injured his other knee and was ruled out for a further two months. Back in the league and a trip to Preston North End culminated in a 1–0 win thanks to a Dave Kitson goal, before a Nick Blackman penalty was enough to claim the same result in a home game against Walsall. With the month almost over the Blades beat the likes of Manchester United, Manchester City, Chelsea and Arsnenal by handing a three-year deal to 17-year-old Academy player Diego De Girolamo, before another Nick Blackman spot-kick was enough to despatch Portsmouth 1–0 at Bramall Lane.

November began with a trip to Bristol to face Bristol Rovers in the first round of the FA Cup. Despite conceding an early goal United came back to score twice in the second half and book their place in the second round. Back in League One an away trip to Swindon Town ended in a 0–0 stalemate, but it was a result that allowed United to climb into the automatic promotion places for the first time in the season. A few days later vice-captain Neill Collins extended his current contract by a further two years until Summer 2015 with the option of another year, before the Blades unbeaten run finally came to an end as they conceded a controversial last minute penalty to lose 1–0 away at Milton Keynes Dons. The following week Matthew Harriott was allowed to join Alfreton Town on loan, initially until 9 December, while Harry Maguire made his England Under-21 début as a substitute in the 60th minute, coming on for Liverpool's Andre Wisdom in a 2–0 against Northern Ireland Under-21 at Bloomfield Road. A few days later it was announced that Danny Wilson had been named League One Manager of the Month and that George Long had won League One Player of the Month for October. Later the same day, Dave Kitson extended his contract until the end of the season with the option of another year; Kitson stated that "It wouldn't have sat comfortably with me to leave a job half done after integrating myself into a great squad". At the end of a busy week free agent and former Wales national goalkeeper Danny Coyne signed a 28-day deal as cover for George Long as third choice keeper George Willis had sustained a minor injury preventing him from playing. Seven days after the disappointing defeat at MK Dons, United returned to winning ways in emphatic style, convincingly beating promotion rivals Stevenage 4–1 at Bramall Lane, thanks in part to a brace from Shaun Miller who was making his first league start for United. A mid-week home fixture against Crewe Alexandra followed which ended in a 3–3 draw, despite United having taken a two-goal lead in the first half. The following day Jordan Chapell extended his loan with Burton Albion for a further month, before the final game of November saw United slip to a damaging 2–0 defeat away at Brentford.

December and January: (Briefly) Top of the league

On 1 December the Blades returned to winning ways with a late 2–1 victory over former United boss Micky Adams's Port Vale side in the second round of the FA Cup at Bramall Lane. Shaun Miller saved the day for the Blades with a brace in injury time after Vale had taken the lead in the first half. With the Blades beginning to struggle with injuries Jordan Chapell was recalled early from his loan spell at Burton Albion, and returned to the United first-team later that day as the Blades crashed out of the Football League Trophy on penalties to Coventry City. Meanwhile, Matthew Harriott extended his loan deal with Alfreton Town until 6 January and back in the league United returned to winning ways, defeating Carlisle United 3–1, but were held to a 0–0 draw by table-topping Tranmere Rovers the following week. After Danny Coyne extended his short-term contract to keep him with the club until the end of January, United started their festive programme by rising to the top of the League One table following a 2–0 win over Crawley Town on their first ever visit to the Broadfield Stadium thanks to two goals from Tony McMahon, before a comfortable 3–0 home win over Scunthorpe United on Boxing Day consolidated their place as league leaders. With injuries and suspensions starting to weaken the first-team United finished the year by slipping to a surprising 2–3 home defeat to bottom club Hartlepool United, a result which saw them drop to second in the table. On 28 December it was announced that due to injuries sustained against Scunthorpe United, Shaun Miller would be out for the remainder of the season and out up to nine months in total with a cruciate knee ligament injury; whilst Neill Collins would be out for around two months with a fractured cheekbone.

The opening of the January transfer window allowed Danny Wilson to strengthen his squad by signing experienced defender Danny Higginbotham on a free transfer from Stoke City on New Years Day, and both he and Elliott Whitehouse made their United débuts for United that afternoon in the South Yorkshire derby against Doncaster Rovers at the Keepmoat Stadium where the Blades needed late goals from Blackman and Kitson to rescue a 2–2 draw. On 3 January Danny Wilson continued to revamp the squad by signing winger Jamie Murphy from Motherwell on a three and a half-year contract for an undisclosed fee, whilst John Cofie's loan deal was terminated and he returned to his parent club Manchester United, despite claiming that he wanted to see out the season with the Blades. Young forward Diego De Girolamo was called up to the Italy national under-18 squad ahead of the Blade's third round FA Cup tie at Oxford United. Murphy made his Blades debut against Oxford United as they booked their place in the fourth round, running out 3–0 winners thanks to goals from McMahon, Kitson and Blackman, earning United a trip to the Madejski Stadium against Premier League strugglers Reading. United continued to struggle with injuries as defender Matt Hill was ruled out for six weeks with a fractured cheek bone following the game at Oxford. United's transfer dealings continued with midfielder David McAllister leaving the Blades for former loan club Shrewsbury Town for an undisclosed fee, Alfreton Town decided to extend Matty Harriott's loan for a third month, and youth keeper George Willis signed his first professional contract with the Blades on a two and half-year deal. United's disappointing league form continued as they were beaten 2–0 at home by Yeovil Town, and allowed Notts County to score a late equaliser to draw 1–1 despite being reduced to ten men for much of the game. With the transfer window close to completion United allowed young striker Danny Philliskirk to leave after cancelling his contract. With the Blades game at Bury postponed due to weather conditions, their next match was the FA Cup fourth round tie at Reading, a match which saw United crash out of the competition following a 4–0 defeat. With a day of the transfer window remaining Reading agreed a deal to sign Nick Blackman, only six months after he had arrived at Bramall Lane, and after he had rejected a move to Crystal Palace. On deadline day itself former United youth player Jonathan Forte returned to the Blades on loan for the rest of the season from Southampton and Scottish international Barry Robson signed a short-term deal until the end of the season.

February and March: Moving back up
United's poor home form continued into February as they suffered their third consecutive home loss, going down 2–1 to Coventry City. With United's home fixture against Crawley Town postponed due to a waterlogged pitch, the first time in ten years United had had to postpone a match for such a reason, their next fixture was an away trip to Shrewsbury Town where goals from Michael Doyle and Dave Kitson helped them to a 2–1 victory and their first league win of 2013. United registered back-to-back victories with a 2–0 away win over Bury, before signing young striker Dominic Poleon from Leeds United on loan until the end of the season, and allowing Chris Porter to sign a one-month loan deal with Shrewsbury Town. United climbed back into the automatic promotion places as they registered their first home win of 2013, beating Colchester United 3–0. On 18 February Coyne once again extended his stay with United keeping him at the Lane until late March. A fourth straight victory saw United return to the top of the table, leapfrogging their hosts Bournemouth after a 1–0 victory. Teenager Harry Maguire made his 100th start for the Blades in their next game, but United slipped back to second place following a 0–0 home draw with Leyton Orient.

March started with a 2–0 victory over Oldham Athletic, before the Blades managed to hold onto second place in the league, despite being held to a second consecutive 0–0 home draw, this time against Milton Keynes Dons. After United's scheduled trip to Crewe Alexandra was postponed due to a frozen pitch, Jordan Chapell was loaned out to Torquay United until the end of the season. The following day Chris Porter returned from his loan spell at Shrewsbury Town to increase United's striking options, before United's away run was brought to a halt as Stevenage beat them 4–0 at The Lamex Stadium. United signed young striker Joe Ironside to a two and a half-year deal, before allowing Richard Cresswell to re-join his first ever club, York City, on a one-month loan deal. Later the same day former United player Jamie Hoyland resigned his post as Academy manager. Due to a lack of first team opportunities Erik Tønne was allowed to return to his native Norway for a trial with HamKam ahead of a potential loan move. A busy week off the field concluded with young keeper George Long being named Young Player of the Month for February 2013 by The Football League. United's fixture problems continued when their scheduled home game with Brentford was called off due to heavy snowfall, meaning that their first game for two weeks came against promotion rivals Tranmere Rovers, with an own goal from Tranmere's Ash Taylor being enough to secure the points for United.

April: Farewell Danny
April started with yet another goalless draw at Bramall Lane when Carlisle United held their hosts, despite being reduced to ten men for the final third of the game. Two days later on-loan forward Dominic Poleon was recalled by his parent club, Leeds United, while Erik Tønne was allowed to join Norwegian side HamKam on loan until November 2013. An away trip to Walsall provided yet another draw for United, with a second half goal from Chris Porter rescuing a point for the Blades. United continued their disappointing home form into the following game when Crawley Town were 2–0 victors, a result that saw Danny Wilson sacked the following day, and being replaced by reserve team coach Chris Morgan for the remainder of the season. The following day the club announced former player and Academy coach, David Unsworth as assistant to Morgan for the duration of his tenure. The new management team's first action was to recall Jordan Chapell from his loan spell at Torquay United. Chris Morgan's first game in charge saw Swindon Town visit Bramall Lane, with United running out as 2–0 winners, thanks to goals from Porter and Kitson. Following an injury to one of his Achilles tendons, Richard Cresswell returned early from his loan at York City, the day before a dramatic game home against Brentford saw three players sent off and four penalties awarded as the teams played out a 2–2 draw. On the penultimate weekend of the season United, saw their hopes of automatic promotion extinguished as they were beaten 3–0 by already relegated Portsmouth, although results elsewhere confirmed their place in the play-offs. Their poor form continued with a 1−0 away loss Crewe Alexandra, followed by yet another 0–0 home draw against Preston North End in the final game of the regular season. Meanwhile, Academy prospects Conor Dimaio and Jamie McDonagh were called up to the Ireland under–18s and the Northern Ireland under–19s respectively, while young defender Harry Maguire was named as the club's Player of the Year and was named in the PFA League One Team of the Year, winning both for the second season in succession.

May: Play-off Misery again
Having finished fifth in the final table, United were paired with fourth place Yeovil Town in the play-off semi-final.  The first leg was played at Bramall Lane, where a close game resulted in substitute Callum McFadzean scoring the only goal, giving United a slender advantage going into the second game. The second leg was another tight affair but United created few chances on goal and were beaten 2–0 by their hosts to record a seventh successive failure in play-off competitions.

Squad

Out on loan

Players leaving before the end of the season

Transfers and contracts

In

Summer

Winter

Loan in

Out

Summer

Winter

Loan out

Contracts
New contracts and contract extensions.

League table

Season firsts

Player début
Players making their first team Sheffield United début in a fully competitive match.

Début goal

Players scoring their first goal for Sheffield United in a competitive fixture.

Competitive fixture
First ever meeting of the two clubs in a competitive fixture.

Stadia
First ever visit to a stadium for a competitive fixture

Squad statistics

Appearances and goals

|-
|colspan="16"|Players who left before the end of the season:

|}

Top scorers

Disciplinary record

Suspensions

Date of start of suspension assumed to be the date of the game during which the disciplinary incident occurred.

International Call-ups

Matches

Key

Football League One

Play-offs

FA Cup

Football League Cup

Football League Trophy

Pre-Season and friendlies

Honours and awards

PFA League One Team of the Season
Harry Maguire

Football League Young Player of the Month
February: George Long

League One Manager of the Month
October: Danny Wilson

League One Player of the Month
October: George Long

League One Team of the Week

17/18 August: David McAllister, Marcus Williams
1/2 September: Ryan Flynn
8 September: Tony McMahon
15 September: Mark Howard
22 September: Neill Collins
6 October: Tony McMahon, Kevin McDonald
20 October: David McAllister
17 November: Shaun Miller
15 December: Harry Maguire

18/19 January: Harry Maguire
16 February: Neill Collins, Kevin McDonald
23/24 February: George Long
1/2 March: Harry Maguire
12/13 April: Neill Collins

Club end of season award
Player of the Year: Harry Maguire
Young Player of the Year: George Long
Goal of the Season: Tony McMahon (v Crawley Town)
Community Player of the Year: Neill Collins

Fans Player of the Month

August: Nick Blackman
September: Nick Blackman
October: Dave Kitson
November: George Long
December: Nick Blackman

January: Tony McMahon
February: Dave Kitson
March: George Long

References

External links
 Sheffield United F.C. Official Website

Sheffield United F.C. seasons
Sheffield United